George Soros has funded a variety of political projects in recent years.

Political organizations

Founded or helped to found
Open Society Foundations
New America

Supported

 Verificat 
Chequeado
Maldita.es
Colombiacheck
Czech Republic
Fundamedios
Correctiv
Best for Britain
 European Movement UK
 Scientists for EU
 Media Matters for America
 Center for Public Integrity
 Human Rights Watch
 Priorities USA Action
 American Bridge 21st Century
 America Votes
 Millennium Promise
 Tides Center and Foundation
Wikimedia Endowment
 MoveOn
 America Coming Together

Studies
 Lancet surveys of Iraq War casualties

External links
 Open Society Foundations (formerly Open Society Institute, OSI)

References

Soros projects
Projects